Astrapotheria is an extinct order of South American and Antarctic hoofed mammals that existed from the late Paleocene to the Middle Miocene, . Astrapotheres were large and rhinoceros-like animals and have been called one of the most bizarre orders of mammals with an enigmatic evolutionary history.

This taxonomy of this order is not clear, but it may belong to Meridiungulata (along with Notoungulata, Litopterna, Pyrotheria and Xenungulata). In turn, Meridungulata is believed to belong to the extant superorder Laurasiatheria. Some scientists have regarded the astrapotheres (and sometimes the Meridiungulata as a whole) as members of the clade Atlantogenata. However,  collagen and mitochondrial DNA sequence data analysed in 2015 places at least the notoungulates and litopterns firmly within Laurasiatheria, as a sister group to the perissodactyls.

Description 

Their lophodont molars and tusk-like canines became extremely large and ever-growing in later astrapotheres.  The upper molars lack an ectocingulum and are dominated by well-developed ectoloph and protoloph.  Additional lophs formed in some derived taxa.  They had lower molars with two cross-lophs, including a high protocristid, and eventually became almost selenodont.  As a result, their dentition is similar to notoungulates, but it seems to have evolved independently.  The cheek teeth are similar to rhinocerotoids, including similar microstructure, which indicate they had the same function.

Postcranially, astrapotheres are relatively robust and more or less graviportal but have slender long bones, most notably in the hindlegs, suggesting they were amphibious.  In order to support their proboscises and large heads they had relatively long and massive necks in relation to the rest of the vertebral column.  Their feet are pentadactyl with short and stout podial and metapodial bones.  Most characteristic for the order are the flat astragalus, equipped with a short neck and a flat head, articulating with both the navicular and cuboid bones; and their calcaneus with its enlarged peroneal tubercle.

Three families are recognized: Eoastrapostylopidae from the late Paleocene, Trigonostylopidae from the Paleocene-Eocene, and Astrapotheriidae from the Eocene-Miocene. The Brazilian, Itaboraian Tetragonostylops and the Argentinian, Riochican Eoastrapostylops are the oldest astrapotheres. The latter, with its low-crowned and lophoselenodont cheek teeth, is considered the most primitive astrapothere. Trigonostylopids are distinct from other astrapotheres in their ear anatomy but are included in the order because of otherwise similar characters. Antarctodon is one of few eutherian mammals, as well as one of the last known terrestrial vertebrates, found in Antarctica.

They had lost their anterior premolars, resulting in a gap between their tusks and the hypsodont cheek teeth. The short and retracted nasal bones indicate a moderately developed proboscis. The small Eocene Trigonostylops lacked such retracted nasals and probably also a proboscis. Other astrapotheriids, such as the Casamayoran Scaglia and Albertogaudrya, were between a sheep and a tapir in size and already the largest South American mammals.

Classification 
There is no scientific consensus regarding the classification within Astrapotheria. For example,  originally described Tetragonostylops as a trigonostylopid but Soria 1982 and 1984 transferred the genus to Astrapotheriidae and concluded that the remaining two genera in that family, Trigonostylops and Shecenia, form a basal collateral branch within Astrapotheriidae.

 Astrapotheriidae 
 Albertogaudrya 
 Antarctodon 
 Astrapodon 
 Astraponotus 
 Astrapothericulus 
 Astrapotherium 
 Comahuetherium 
 Granastrapotherium 
 Hilarcotherium 
Liarthrus 
 Maddenia 
 Parastrapotherium 
 Scaglia 
 Uruguaytherium 
 Xenastrapotherium 
 Eoastrapostylopidae 
 Eoastrapostylops 
 Trigonostylopidae 
 Shecenia 
 Tetragonostylops 
 Trigonostylops

References

Bibliography 

 
 
 
 
 
 
 
 
 
 
 
 
 
 
 
 
 
 
 
 
 
 

Meridiungulata
Paleocene first appearances
Miocene extinctions
Paleogene Antarctica
Cenozoic mammals of Antarctica
Cenozoic animals of Antarctica
Laventan
Colloncuran
Friasian
Santacrucian
Colhuehuapian
Deseadan
Tinguirirican
Divisaderan
Mustersan
Casamayoran
Riochican
Itaboraian
Fossil taxa described in 1894
Taxa named by Richard Lydekker
Prehistoric animal orders
Mammal orders